Medvedevo is a rural locality (a village) in Paustovskoye Rural Settlement, Vyaznikovsky District, Vladimir Oblast, Russia. The population was 99 as of 2010.

Geography 
Medvedevo is located 40 km south of Vyazniki (the district's administrative centre) by road. Sergiyevy-Gorki is the nearest rural locality.

References 

Rural localities in Vyaznikovsky District